Gary Patrick Gilroy (born 1958) is a musician, composer, and educator. Currently, he is Professor of Music and Director of Bands at California State University, Fresno. 

Gilroy assumed the position of Associate Director of Bands and Director of the Bulldog Marching Band & Colorguard at Fresno State in 1993. Prior to this appointment, he served for a decade as Director of Bands at Fred C. Beyer High School in Modesto, California where his band was awarded several national honors, including the International Sudler Shield Award from the John Philip Sousa Foundation. Gilroy also served on faculty at CSU and Stanislaus.

As an adjudicator for Drum Corps International, Music in the Parks, Youth in the Arts, and Bands of America he has served in 39 states and throughout Canada. He has been involved as a performer or instructor/arranger for many Drum and Bugle Corps including the Santa Clara Vanguard, Valley Fever and the Concord Blue Devils. He completed his doctorate in 1995 at the University of Oregon at Eugene.

References

External links
 Dr. Gary P. Gilroy Short Bio at the California State University, Fresno Music Dept. website
 Gary P. Gilroy Music Publications

1958 births
American musicologists
Living people